The 2007–08 Slovenian PrvaLiga season started on 20 July 2007 and ended on 31 May 2008. Each team played a total of 36 matches.

Clubs

League table

Relegation play-offs

Drava Ptuj won 2–1 on aggregate.

Results
Every team plays four times against their opponents, twice at home and twice on the road, for a total of 36 matches.

First half of the season

Second half of the season

Top goalscorers 

Source: PrvaLiga.si

See also
2007 Slovenian Supercup
2007–08 Slovenian Football Cup
2007–08 Slovenian Second League

References
General

Specific

External links
Official website of the PrvaLiga 

Slovenian PrvaLiga seasons
Slovenia
1